Claire Elizabeth Foy (born 16 April 1984) is a British actress. She is best known for her portrayal of the young Queen Elizabeth II in the first two seasons of the Netflix series The Crown (2016–2017) for which she won a Primetime Emmy Award for Outstanding Lead Actress in a Drama Series.

Foy made her screen debut in the pilot episode of the supernatural comedy series Being Human (2008). Following her professional stage debut at the Royal National Theatre, she played the title role in the BBC One miniseries Little Dorrit (2008) and made her film debut in the American historical fantasy drama Season of the Witch (2011). Following leading roles in the television series The Promise (2011) and Crossbones (2014), Foy earned praise for portraying the ill-fated queen Anne Boleyn in the BBC miniseries Wolf Hall (2015), receiving a British Academy Television Award for Best Actress nomination.

In 2018, she starred in Steven Soderbergh's psychological thriller Unsane and portrayed Janet Shearon, wife of astronaut Neil Armstrong, in Damien Chazelle's biopic First Man. For the latter she received a nomination for the Golden Globe Award and the BAFTA Award for Best Supporting Actress. In 2021, she portrayed Margaret Campbell, Duchess of Argyll in the Amazon Prime series A Very British Scandal, and in 2022, she starred in the drama film Women Talking.

Early life
Claire Elizabeth Foy was born in Stockport on 16 April 1984, the youngest of three children. She has an older brother, Robert, and an older sister, Gemma. She has said that her mother, Caroline, comes from a "massive" Irish family; her maternal grandparents are from Dublin and Kildare. She grew up in Manchester and Leeds, and the family later moved to Longwick, Buckinghamshire, for her father's job as a Rank Xerox salesman. Her parents divorced when she was eight. 

Foy was educated at Aylesbury High School from the age of 12 and later studied drama at Liverpool John Moores University. She also took a one-year course at the Oxford School of Drama, graduating in 2007 and moving to the Peckham area of south London to share a house with five friends from drama school.

Career

While at the Oxford School of Drama, Foy appeared in the plays Top Girls, Watership Down, Easy Virtue, and Touched. After appearing on television, she made her professional stage debut in DNA and The Miracle, two of a trio of single acts directed by Paul Miller at the Royal National Theatre in London (the third was Baby Girl).

Foy starred as the protagonist, Amy Dorrit, in the BBC series Little Dorrit. She was nominated for an RTS Award. She went on to appear in the TV film Going Postal and the horror adventure film Season of the Witch. Foy also starred in the BBC revival of Upstairs Downstairs as Lady Persephone, and co-starred in the Channel 4 serial The Promise, broadcast in February 2011.

Foy played a lead role, Helen, in the TV movie The Night Watch, which was based on a Sarah Waters novel. She returned to the stage in February 2013 as Lady Macbeth, alongside James McAvoy in the title role, in Macbeth at the Trafalgar Studios.

In 2015, Foy played the English queen Anne Boleyn in the six-part drama serial Wolf Hall. Her performance was met with critical praise and compared to Geneviève Bujold's performance in Anne of the Thousand Days. Foy was subsequently nominated for the 2016 British Academy Television Award for Best Actress.

In 2016, Foy portrayed the young Queen Elizabeth II in Peter Morgan's Netflix biographical drama series The Crown. Her performance earned her the Golden Globe Award for Best Actress – Television Series Drama, the Screen Actors Guild Award for Outstanding Performance by a Female Actor in a Drama Series twice, and the Primetime Emmy Award for Outstanding Lead Actress in a Drama Series. She was also nominated for the BAFTA TV Award for Best Actress. In 2017, she reprised the role in the second season, before the role passed to actress Olivia Colman, who would portray the Queen in middle age, beginning in the third season. Also in 2017, Foy starred as Diana Cavendish in the biographical drama film Breathe. 

In 2018, Foy starred in Steven Soderbergh's psychological thriller Unsane, portrayed the vigilante Lisbeth Salander in the action-thriller The Girl in the Spider's Web, and played Janet Shearon, wife of American astronaut Neil Armstrong, in Damien Chazelle's biopic First Man. For the latter, she was nominated for the Golden Globe Award for Best Supporting Actress – Motion Picture, the Critics’ Choice Award for Best Supporting Actress, and the British Academy of Film and Television Arts Award for Best Supporting Actress. In 2020, Foy reprised the role of the young Queen Elizabeth II in the eighth episode of The Crowns fourth season. Her performance earned her the Primetime Emmy Award for Outstanding Guest Actress in a Drama Series.

In 2021, Foy starred as Margaret Campbell, Duchess of Argyll in the BBC production A Very British Scandal.

In October 2021, Foy was cast as Facebook COO Sheryl Sandberg in the drama series Doomsday Machine, based on the book Ugly Truth: Inside Facebook’s Battle for Domination by Sheera Frenkel and Cecilia Kang.
The limited series has landed at HBO for development with the network closing a deal on 8 February 2022, following a multiple-outlet bidding war. In November 2022, Foy reprised the role of the young Queen Elizabeth in the season five premiere of The Crown.

Personal life
Foy married actor Stephen Campbell Moore in 2014. They have one child. They announced their separation in February 2018.

In 2021, Foy was targeted by a stalker, who sent her more than 1,000 emails in one month and turned up at her house; the stalker, Jason Penrose, pleaded guilty in November 2022, and received a suspended sentence pending repatriation to the United States.

Acting credits

Film

Television

Theatre

Awards and nominations

References

External links

 
 

1984 births
Living people
21st-century English actresses
Actresses from Greater Manchester
Alumni of Liverpool John Moores University
Alumni of the Oxford School of Drama
Audiobook narrators
Best Drama Actress Golden Globe (television) winners
English film actresses
English people of Irish descent
English stage actresses
English television actresses
English voice actresses
Outstanding Performance by a Female Actor in a Drama Series Screen Actors Guild Award winners
Outstanding Performance by a Lead Actress in a Drama Series Primetime Emmy Award winners
People educated at Aylesbury High School
Actors from Stockport
English victims of crime